Chosonentulus is a genus of proturans in the family Acerentomidae.

Species
 Chosonentulus chosonicus Imadaté & Szeptycki, 1976

References

Protura